Lila is the debut album of American country music singer Lila McCann. Released in 1997 on Asylum Records, the album produced four singles on the Billboard Hot Country Singles & Tracks (now Hot Country Songs) charts: "Down Came a Blackbird" (#28), "I Wanna Fall in Love" (#3, McCann's highest-charting single), a cover of Sheena Easton's "Almost Over You" (#42) and finally, "Yippy Ky Yay" (#63). The album itself has been certified platinum by the RIAA for U.S. shipments of one million copies, and it was the highest-selling debut album by a country artist in 1997.

Track listing

Personnel
Adapted from liner notes.

Mike Brignardello - bass guitar
Dennis Burnside - piano
Larry Byrom - acoustic guitar, electric guitar
Kim Carnes - background vocals (track 2)
Stuart Duncan - fiddle, mandolin, dobro
Dan Dugmore - steel guitar and electric dobro (track 2)
Paul Franklin - steel guitar
Sonny Garrish - steel guitar
John Hobbs - piano, keyboards, additional piano and keyboard overdubs (tracks 1, 4, 5, 8)
Dann Huff - acoustic guitar, electric guitar
Jana King-Evans - background vocals (track 1)
Liana Manis - background vocals (track 9)
Brent Mason - electric guitar
Lila McCann - lead vocals, background vocals
Terry McMillan - harmonica (track 5)
Mark Spiro - background vocals
Lonnie Wilson - drums

Charts

Weekly charts

Year-end charts

References

Allmusic (see infobox)

1997 debut albums
Asylum Records albums
Lila McCann albums